The Bulgarian St. Stephen Church, also known as the Bulgarian Iron Church, is a Bulgarian Orthodox church in Balat, Istanbul, Turkey. It is famous for being made of prefabricated cast iron elements in the Neo-Byzantine style. The church belongs to the Bulgarian Christian minority in the city.

History 

The Bulgarian Orthodox Christians of the Ottoman Empire used to pray at the churches of the Phanar Orthodox Patriarchate, as they were part of the Rum Millet—that is, the Orthodox Christian community of the Ottoman Empire—but the Bulgarian nationalist movement of the 19th century advocated the creation of a separate Bulgarian ecclesiastical organization for Bulgarian Orthodox Christians, as they considered the Phanar Patriarchate a predominantly Greek Orthodox institution. These efforts culminated in the recognition of the Bulgarian Exarchate through a firman issued by the Ottoman sultan Abdülaziz in 1870.

The richly ornamented church is a three-domed cross-shaped basilica. The altar faces the Golden Horn and a 40 m-high belfry, the six bells of which were cast in Yaroslavl, rises above the narthex. Initially, a small wooden church was erected on the shore of the Golden Horn between Balat and Fener squares (near Eyüp District), where the current church is located. A house was donated by the statesman Stefan Bogoridi, and it was reorganized as a wooden church. It was inaugurated on 9 October 1849 and became an important site of the Bulgarian National Revival. The Ottoman royal decree of 28 February 1870 establishing the Bulgarian Exarchate was first read in the church.

After the original wooden structure suffered from a fire, the larger current building was constructed at its place. An iron frame was preferred to concrete reinforcement because of the weak ground conditions. The construction plans were prepared by the Istanbul-based Ottoman Armenian architect Hovsep Aznavur.

An international competition was conducted to produce the prefabricated cast iron parts of the church, won by an Austrian company, R. Ph. Waagner. The prefabricated elements, weighing 500 tons, were produced in Vienna in 1893 to 1896 and transported to Istanbul by ship through the Danube and the Black Sea.

After one-and-a-half years, the church was completed in 1898 and inaugurated by Exarch Joseph on 8 September that year. The main skeleton of the church was made of steel and covered by metal boards. All the pieces were attached together with nuts, bolts, rivets or welding. In terms of architectural style, the church combines Neo-Byzantine and Neo-Baroque influences.

St. Stephen was the product of 19th-century experimentation with prefabricated iron churches. The British, who invented the corrugated iron in 1829, manufactured portable iron churches to send to far-flung colonies like Australia. The Eiffel Tower's creator, French engineer Gustave Eiffel, designed iron churches that were sent as far as the Philippines and Peru. Now, St. Stephen is one of the world's few surviving prefabricated cast iron churches.

On December 27, 2010, St. Stephen's feast day, a celebratory Mass was held at the church in honor of its patron saint. Attending were the Vratsa Metropolitan Kalinik, bishop Naum, Chief Secretary of the Bulgarian Holy Synod, and representatives of the "St. Stephen Church" Foundation. Honoring the celebration the dome of the church was gold-plated using funds donated by the Bulgarians of Plovdiv.

The church building underwent a renovation, which started under the Bulgarian-Turkish cooperation in 2011 and cost more than  15 million. On January 8, 2018, Turkish President Recep Tayyip Erdogan and Bulgarian Prime Minister Boyko Borisov were present at the inauguration of the renovated St. Stephen's Orthodox Church in Istanbul, on the occasion of its 120th anniversary.

In addition to the St. Stephen Church, there is another Bulgarian Orthodox church in Istanbul, St. Demetrius Church, in Feriköy.

Burials
 Ilarion Makariopolski

Gallery

References

External links

 Information about the church on a site about the Bulgarians in Istanbul 
 The St Stephen Foundation 
 A Bulgarian National Radio report also telling the history of the church 
 Monkeytravel info and photos (incl. detail photo) 
 Over 100 pictures inside and outside in detail
 Благовеста Иванова. Църквата "Св. Стефан" край Златния рог и нейните събратя 
 Благовеста Иванова, Ради Ганев. "Желязото" и стоманата в храма "Св. Стефан" в Истанбул 
 Благовеста Иванова. Неосъщественият каменен храм "Св. Троица" на брега на Златния рог и архитектите Фосати 
 Благовеста Иванова. Българските старини в Цариград 
 Blagovesta Ivanova, Radi Ganev, Milosh Drdacky. Architectural, Material and Damage Survey of the Bulgarian Metal Church of St. Stefan in Istanbul
 Blagovesta Ivanova, Radi Ganev & Miloš Drdácký. Historical and Condition Survey of the St. Stefan Bulgarian Metal Church in Istanbul
 Tigran Khzmalyan. Armenian Architects of Istanbul: Online Exhibition, March 27, 2015
 Stefan Bulgar Kilisesi 
 Иванова, Бл. Невидимата страна на «желязната» църква в Истанбул. Инженерни науки, 1/2018, с. 45-60./Ivanova, Bl. NONSEEN SIDE OF THE "IRON" CHURCH IN ISTANBUL. - Engineering Sciences, LV, 2018, No. 1,p. 45-60  DOI:10.7546/EngSci.LV.18.01.04
 Ivanova-Tsotsova, Bl. The Architectural Complex at the Golden Horn a Monument of Cultural Heritage of Bulgaria and Turkey. - International Journal of Engineering and Technical Research (IJETR) ISSN: 2321-0869 (O) 2454-4698 (P) Volume-8, Issue-3, March 2018, p. 27-35. 

Stephen Church, Bulgarian St.
Stephen Church, Bulgarian St.
Stephen Church, Bulgarian St.
Stephen Church, Bulgarian St.
Stephen Church, Bulgarian St.
Stephen Church, Bulgarian St.
Cast-iron architecture
Stephen Church, Bulgarian St.
Churches completed in 1898
Fatih
Golden Horn